Chueca can refer to:

 Chueca, neighborhood in Madrid, Spain
 its metro station, also called Chueca
 Chueca, Toledo, town in Toledo, Castilla-La Mancha, Spain
 , a Castilian game
 Palin (game), a Mapuche game that was called chueca by the Spanish conquistadors

Surname
 Federico Chueca, Spanish composer 
 , Spanish architect